Garry Pankhurst (born October 1957) is an Australian former child actor and exporter, best known for his role as Sonny Hammond in the 1960s Australian children's television series Skippy. He left the acting profession and went into hotel and restaurant management.  He later started a career in meat export to Malaysia which included kangaroo meat, a situation he referred to as "Sonny's revenge".

References

External links
 Ed Devereaux, Skippy's keeper, dies at 78

1957 births
Australian male child actors
Australian male television actors
Living people